Salt pans can refer to: 

Salt pan (geology), a flat expanse of ground covered with salt and other minerals, usually found in deserts
Sabkha, a phonetic translation of the Arabic word for a salt pan (geology)
Salt evaporation pond, a method of producing salt by evaporating brine

Open-pan salt making is a method of salt production wherein salt is extracted from the brine using vacuum pans

See also
Dry lake
Hypersalinity
Salt lake
Salt pannes and pools